Al Maktoum International Airport , also known as Dubai World Central, is an international airport in Jebel Ali,  southwest of Dubai, United Arab Emirates that opened on 27 June 2010. It is the main part of Dubai South, a planned residential, commercial and logistics complex.

When fully completed (originally expected 2027), the airport will contain transport modes, logistics, and value-added services, including manufacturing and assembly, in a single free economic zone. , only a handful of airlines operated passenger services out of Al Maktoum International Airport with a focus on freight activity. A completion of the project is yet to be confirmed.

History

Construction 
The  runway was completed in 600 days and subsequently underwent tests over the following six to eight months in order to fulfil its CAT III-C requirements. Construction of the airport's cargo terminal, the Al Maktoum Airport Cargo Gateway, which cost around US$75 million, was 50% complete by the end of 2008.

The passenger terminal at this phase is designed to have a capacity of 5 million passengers per year.

The project was originally expected to be fully operational by 2017, although the 2007–2012 global financial crisis subsequently postponed the completion of the complex to 2027. Previous working names for the airport complex have included "Jebel Ali International Airport", "Jebel Ali Airport City", and "Dubai World Central International Airport". It has been named after the late Sheikh Maktoum bin Rashid Al Maktoum, the former ruler of Dubai.  The total cost of the airport has been estimated by the Dubai government to be $82 billion. The Dubai Central airport in Dubai has also been called a white elephant.

Operations
Al Maktoum International Airport opened on 27 June 2010 with one runway and only cargo flights. The first flight into the airport occurred on 20 June 2010, when an Emirates SkyCargo Boeing 777F landed after a flight from Hong Kong. The flight served as a test for various functions such as air traffic control, movement of aircraft on the ground, and security. According to Emirates, the flight was an "unmitigated success".

On 24 February 2011, the airport was certified to handle passenger aircraft with up to 60 passengers. The first passenger aircraft touched down on 28 February 2011, an Airbus A319CJ. The airport officially opened for passenger flights on 26 October 2013 with Nas Air and Wizz Air as the two carriers to operate from the airport.

In the first quarter of 2014, 102,000 passengers went through the airport. At the time of its opening, three cargo service airlines served Al Maktoum International Airport, including RUS Aviation, Skyline Air and Aerospace Consortium. Fifteen additional airlines have signed a contract to operate flights to the airport.

Passenger numbers in the first half of 2016 totalled 410,278, up from 209,989 in the first half of 2015.

Expansion plans

It is supposed to become the largest airport in the world in both physical size and passenger volume. It will be surrounded by a logistics hub, a luxurious golf resort, a trade and exhibition facility with 3 million square metres of exhibition space, a commercial district, and a residential and hotel area.

Al Maktoum International Airport intends to handle all types of aircraft. Up to four aircraft will be able to land simultaneously. The airport was initially planned to have six runways, but this number was reduced to five  parallel runways in April 2009, with a large passenger complex in the middle. Furthermore, each runway would have extended asphalted pathways on either side which would allow aircraft to by-pass other runways and taxiways without disturbing aircraft movements of these runways and taxiways. Dubai expects an exponential rise in passenger traffic over its skies, with the presumption that it will become the primary air hub for travellers in transit from the Asia–Pacific Region, South Asia, Greater Middle East, Africa, Europe, and Australia (for the Kangaroo route: Australia to Britain and back).

The planned facilities for the airport in its final stage, are expected to compose:
 6 runways, 1 already constructed
 Three passenger terminals, including two luxury facilities; one dedicated to Emirates, the second to other carriers, and the third dedicated to low-cost carriers
 Multiple concourses
 Executive and royal jet centres
 Hotels and shopping malls
 Support and maintenance facilities: the region's only hub for A-, B-, and C-checks on all aircraft up to A380 specifications

Several large warehouses and hangars line the westernmost part of the airport. These interlinked hangars will stretch from end-to-end of the westernmost runway. Each of these is capable of housing A380 aircraft. Al Maktoum International Airport is also planned to have a total of 100,000 parking slots for automobile vehicles for its employees, Dubai residents, tourists, and other users. Al Maktoum International Airport is supposed be linked to the existing Dubai International Airport by a proposed hyperloop system and a high-speed rail system, as well as being served by the Dubai Metro and a dedicated Dubai World Central light railway. It will also be linked to the District 2020 neighbourhood by road.

Airlines and destinations

Passenger

Cargo

References

External links 

 Official website

Proposed buildings and structures in Dubai
Airports in the United Arab Emirates
Government-owned companies of the United Arab Emirates
Transport in Dubai